Einride AB is a Swedish transport company based in Stockholm, Sweden, specializing in electric and self-driving vehicles known as Einride pods (formerly T-pods). The pods are electric trucks remotely controlled by drivers, and are notable for their lack of a driver’s cab.

History 

The company was founded in 2016 by Robert Falck, Filip Lilja and Linnéa Kornehed. The company manufactures electric and self-driving vehicles.  The company name is a reference to the Nordic god of thunder and lightning, Thor, and means "the lone rider". In the Spring of 2017, the company introduced their transport vehicle, the Einride Pod, an electric truck which does not contain a cabin. The first full-scale prototype of what was then called the T-Pod was revealed on July 4, 2017 at Almedalen Week in Visby, Sweden. Einride has announced their partnerships with Lidl in 2017 and DB Schenker in 2018. On July 12, 2018 as part of Future Lab at the Goodwood Festival of Speed, Einride launched the Einride timber Pod, an autonomous and all-electric logging truck.

On November 5, 2018, Einride launched the first commercial installation of the Einride Pod at a DB Schenker facility in Jönköping, Sweden.  In May 2019, an Einride Pod started daily deliveries on a public road there; it is permitted to go at up to 5 km per hour.

On October 10, 2019 Einride raised $25 million in a Series A investment round led by private-equity firm EQT’s venture capital fund EQT Ventures and NordicNinja VC.

In June 2020, Einride introduced the freight mobility platform, a software suite that analyzes transport networks for electric or autonomous vehicle potential and provides recommendations for implementation.

In October 2020, Einride raised $10 million in additional funding led by existing investors led by Norrsken VC along with EQT Ventures fund, Nordic Ninja VC and Ericsson Ventures.

2020s 
In October 2021, Einride finalized an agreement with General Electric (GE) Appliances for first fleet of autonomous electric trucks.

In March 2022, Einride investor Maersk ordered 300 Class 8 trucks through Einride, built by BYD in California.

In June, 2022, the company received approval to operate its vehicles on US roads.

Technology 
Einride uses self-driving technology as well as remote operation for the Einride Pod which allows drivers to monitor multiple vehicles and remotely control the vehicle in difficult traffic situations. The Einride Pod can travel 200 km (124 miles) on a fully charged battery.

References

External links 

 Einride official website

Self-driving car companies
Car manufacturers of Sweden
Battery electric vehicle manufacturers
Electric vehicle manufacturers of Sweden
Companies based in Stockholm
2016 establishments in Sweden
Vehicle manufacturing companies established in 2016